For the 1973 Tour de France, the winner of the previous four editions, Eddy Merckx had changed sponsors to the Italian Molteni. His contract said that he had to start in the 1973 Vuelta a España and the 1973 Giro d'Italia, and Merckx thought it was impossible to start in three grand tours in one year, so he stayed away from the Tour. Ocana, who was in great shape, was now the main favourite, with Fuente, Poulidor and Thevenet as his biggest threats. However, Ocana was not the clear favorite; he had already crashed out of the Tour three times, and he was seen as fragile. Zoetemelk had changed teams, because he did not have the full support of his team leader.

The Italian teams did not join the 1973 Tour de France, because no top French cyclist joined the 1973 Giro d'Italia. This meant that world champion Marino Basso and former Tour winner Felice Gimondi were absent.
The Tour started with the following 12 teams, each with 11 cyclists:

Start list

By team

By rider

By nationality

References

1973 Tour de France
1973